Mathie is a surname. Notable people with the surname include:

Alex Mathie (born 1968), Scottish football player and manager
Davie Mathie (1919–1954), Scottish football player
Marion Mathie (1925–2012), English actress
Ross Mathie (born 1946), Scottish football player and coach
Scott Mathie (born 1983), South African rugby union player
Surnames from given names